The YF-1 was a Chinese liquid rocket engine burning N2O4 and UDMH in a gas generator cycle. It is a basic engine which when mounted in a four engine module forms the YF-2. It was used as the basis for developing a high altitude version known as the YF-3.

Some authors state that it was a direct copy of С.2.1100/С.2.1150 La-350 booster engine developed by Isayev OKB-2 (NII-88). What is known is that the engine development had great trouble with combustion instabilities and it took a long time to have a reliable combustion.

Versions
The basic engine has been used since the DF-3 rocket and has been the main propulsion of the Long March 1 orbital launch vehicles.

 YF-1: Core engine. Flown originally on the DF-3. Used UDMH/AK27S as propellant. Allegedly a copy of OKB-2's С.2.1150.
 YF-1A: Core engine. Improved version that would power the DF-3A, DF-4 and Long March 1.
 YF-1B: Core engine. Improved version used on the Long March 1D. Switched propellants to UDMH/N2O4
 YF-3: Upper stage version. Used on the DF-4.
 YF-3A: Improved upper stage version. Used on the Long March 1.

Modules
While the basic engine was used multiple times, it was only used as a single engine for booster application. It is usually bundled into modules of multiple engines.

The relevant modules for first stage application are:
 YF-2: A module comprising four YF-1. Flown originally on the DF-3.
 YF-2A: A module comprising four YF-1A. Improved version. Used on the DF-3A, DF-4 and Long March 1.
 YF-2B: A module comprising four YF-1B. Improved version. Final version used on the Long March 1D.

See also
 DF-3A
 DF-4
 Long March 1 (rocket family)
 Long March 1
 Long March 1D

References

Rocket engines of China
Rocket engines using hypergolic propellant
Rocket engines using the gas-generator cycle